The 1968 All-Ireland Under-21 Hurling Championship was the fifth staging of the All-Ireland hurling championship for players under the age of twenty-one since its establishment by the Gaelic Athletic Association in 1964..

Tipperary were the defending champions, however, they were defeated in the provincial stage. Cork won the title after defeating Kilkenny by 2-18 to 3-9 in the final.

Results

Leinster Under-21 Hurling Championship

Final

Munster Under-21 Hurling Championship

First round

Semi-finals

Final

All-Ireland Under-21 Hurling Championship

Semi-final

Final

References

Under-21
All-Ireland Under-21 Hurling Championship